Karlien van Jaarsveld (born 1985) is a South African singer-songwriter in Afrikaans. Her debut album, As the Curtain Falls, was released in 2010. Previously a member of a rock group, she is now a solo artist who has won several awards in South Africa.

Early life
Karlien van Jaarsveld was born on 21 December 1985, in Paarl, South Africa, the eldest of three children. Her brother, Bobby van Jaarsveld, is also a singer and she started performing with him in 2005 as his guitarist and background singer. She also sang a duet with her brother on his first album.

Career
Van Jaarsveld formed a rock band, Revolution (Revolusie), in 2006 and was its lead singer. In October 2008, she left the band to start a solo career. Her debut album, As the Curtain Falls, was released in 2010. Her second album, Jakkals Trou Met Wolf Se Vrou (Jackal Marries Wolf's Wife), was released in 2011. The album's sales reached platinum status in South Africa. In that year she won the Huisgenoot Tempo Award for Afrikaans music, as Best Newcomer. In 2012 she won three awards at the Ghoema Music Awards, for Female Artist of the Year, Pop Record of the Year, and Music Video of the Year. In 2014 she won the South African Music Award for best Pop album in Afrikaans.

Branching out into acting, Van Jaarsveld appeared in the Afrikaans movie Platteland with Steve Hofmeyr, Bok van Blerk, and Lianie May. In 2015 she won Season 8 of the South African version of Strictly Come Dancing, together with her partner, Devon Snell. In 2014 she appeared in the television soap opera, Binnelanders, and in 2015 she appeared as Cinderella in the theatre.

Personal life
She married Joe Breytenbach,  a former rugby player. They have a daughter and a son.

Discography
Van Jaarsveld's albums have been:
2010: As die gordyn val
2011: Jakkals Trou met Wolf se Vrou
2013: Uitklophou
2015: My hartjie
2017: Sing vir liefde

References 

Living people
People from Paarl
Afrikaans-language singers
21st-century South African women singers
1985 births